Olympic Azzaweya Sports Club is a Libyan football club based in Zawiya, Libya.

They are the only club from outside Tripoli or Benghazi to win the Libyan Premier League title. They achieved this in the 2003–04 season. The club boasts former players such as Nader Kara, Marei Al Ramly and Younes Al Shibani. The club did compete in the CAF Champions League once in 2005, where they went out in the first round to USM Alger, 7–0 on aggregate, having beaten Renaissance FC of Chad 3–2 in the preliminary round.

Honours
Libyan Premier League: 1
2003–04

Performance in CAF competitions
CAF Champions League: 1 appearance
2005 – First Round

External links
Official site
Club logo

Olympic
Association football clubs established in 1947
1947 establishments in Libya